Eucyclotoma fusiformis is a species of sea snail, a marine gastropod mollusk in the family Raphitomidae.

Description
The length of the shell attains 8 mm.

The shell is longitudinally ribbed on the spire. The ribs are obsolete on the body whorl, where there are several minute periodical varices, with unequal, more or less crenulated revolving ridges. The outer lip is very finely crenulated. The sinus is small. The color of the shell is white, faintly tinged with yellowish brown.

Distribution
This marine species occurs off the Paumotus, Tuamotu Archipelago and Queensland, Australia.

References

 Garrett, A. 1873. Descriptions of new species of marine shells inhabiting the South Sea Islands. Proceedings of the Academy of Natural Sciences, Philadelphia 1873: 209-231, pls 2-3 
 Powell, A.W.B. 1966. The molluscan families Speightiidae and Turridae, an evaluation of the valid taxa, both Recent and fossil, with list of characteristic species. Bulletin of the Auckland Institute and Museum. Auckland, New Zealand 5: 1–184, pls 1–23 
 Liu J.Y. [Ruiyu] (ed.)(2008). Checklist of marine biota of China seas. China Science Press. 1267 pp.

External links
 
 Gastropods.com: Eucyclotoma fusiformis

fusiformis
Gastropods described in 1873